Chrysendeton nigrescens is a moth in the family Crambidae. It is found on North America, where it has been recorded from Alabama, Florida and Georgia. The habitat consists of pitcher plant bogs.

Adults have been recorded on wing from May to June and from August to September.

References

Moths described in 1991
Acentropinae